is a former Japanese football player.

Playing career
Doi was born in Naruto on April 2, 1972. After graduating from University of Tsukuba, he joined Japan Football League (JFL) club Otsuka Pharmaceutical in 1995, which was based in his local area. In 1997, he moved to JFL club Kawasaki Frontale. He played many matches as a defensive midfielder and the club was promoted to new league J2 League in 1999. In 2000, the club were promoted as champions, but Doi could not play many matches and in the J1 League, and the club was relegated to J2. In 2002, he returned to Otsuka Pharmaceutical, retiring at the end of the season.

Club statistics

References

External links

1972 births
Living people
University of Tsukuba alumni
Association football people from Tokushima Prefecture
Japanese footballers
J1 League players
J2 League players
Japan Football League (1992–1998) players
Japan Football League players
Tokushima Vortis players
Kawasaki Frontale players
Association football defenders